The 2003 Hokkaidō earthquake, scientifically named the , occurred off the coast of Hokkaidō, Japan on 26 September at 04:50 local time (19:50 UTC 25 September). At a focal depth of 27 km (17 mi), this great undersea earthquake measured 8.3 on the moment magnitude scale, making it the most powerful earthquake of 2003, as well as one of the most intense earthquakes to hit Japan since modern record-keeping began in 1900.

The Hokkaido earthquake caused extensive damage, destroying roads all around Hokkaidō, and triggered power outages and extensive landslides. Over 800 people were injured. The earthquake also caused a tsunami reaching 4 meters in height.  The earthquake's presence was felt throughout Japan, stretching all the way to Honshu and Tokyo.

Tectonic setting
The location and moment tensor solution of this earthquake are consistent with it being a result of thrust faulting between the North American Plate and the subducting Pacific Plate. In addition to experiencing large thrust earthquakes that originate on the interface between the plates, eastern Hokkaidō experiences great earthquakes that originate from the interior of the subducted Pacific plate.

The region experienced a catastrophic earthquake and tsunami with an estimated magnitude of 9 in 1667, a magnitude 8.2 event in 1952, a 1968 quake measuring 8.3 , and one in 2008 measuring 7.1, all bearing the name Tokachi-Oki, and a 1973 quake to the immediate north along the Kuril Trench plate boundary called the 1973 Nemuro earthquake.

Aftershocks
As of 3 October 2003, a total of 65 aftershocks were reported near the main shock epicenter. At least one major tremor occurred, measuring magnitude 7.0 on the Richter scale. At the time, specialists assessed a 50% probability of an aftershock of magnitude 6.0 or greater to occur within the subsequent 72 hours, with a 20% chance of its magnitude exceeding 7.0.

Damage and casualties
Despite the earthquake's great intensity, structural damage to the region was comparatively light; the epicenter was located nearly a hundred kilometers offshore, with most structures in its vicinity reported to be resistant to earthquake shaking. The majority of the destruction was confined to coastal areas, such as sea and fishing ports, mostly inflicted by subsequent tsunami waves. Although soil liquefaction was observed over a broad geological area, it occurred in localized areas almost exclusively limited to man-made embankments. The earthquake affected a total of 36 local rivers, including the major Abashiri and Ishikari Rivers. Many properties received considerable damage, two individuals remain missing and 849 people sustained injuries. Monetary losses in Hokkaido amounted to at least ¥213 billion (2003 JPY), or $1.9 billion (2003 USD). One person died after being hit by a car after cleaning up earthquake damage.

Structures
The earthquake and its associated tsunami waves destroyed several oceanside home communities and damaged many others. Over 1,500 houses or buildings – the majority of which were in Kushiro city – suffered considerable damage, with of a total of 141 reported to be partially or completely destroyed. Strong shaking affected many bridges in the region, some sustaining severe damage due to relative motion between spans in excess of design standards. The center of the Rekifune Bridge, located in Taiki, Hiroo, was reported to have sunk about 0.12 m (0.39 ft) at the joint section following significant ground deformation. Some local schools were also damaged, ranging from shattered windows to severed expansion joints and columns. Two town halls in Kushiro and Taiku suffered partial collapses.

At Kushiro Airport, the tremor caused the control tower ceiling to collapse, prompting officials to halt control work for several days. Small cracks were reported in the gates of the Takami Hokkaidō Dam, though no threat of dam failure existed.

Harbour facilities
Several sea ports in the area sustained moderate damage – such as cracks and wall collapse – due to lateral ground spreading caused by liquefaction. Some 123 coastal fishing ports and facilities in eastern Hokkaidō reported significant damage, with an additional 25 ports damaged in Iwate. At least three major ports were affected by the disaster; Kushiro Port sustained great damage to one of its piers as a result of ground displacement and sand boils. Tsunami waves stranded several small boats onshore; various ship containers and oil tanks along coastlines sustained damage. The earthquake left marine oil spills in its wake, though the conditions were quickly normalized.

See also

List of earthquakes in 2003
List of earthquakes in Japan

References

External links

Hokkaido Earthquake, 2003
Hokkaido Earthquake, 2003
Earthquakes of the Heisei period
Megathrust earthquakes in Japan
2003 tsunamis
September 2003 events in Japan
Landslides in Japan
2003 disasters in Japan